D. amseli may refer to:

 Dasylobus amseli, a harvestman in the family Phalangiidae
 Digitivalva amseli, a moth found in Afghanistan